The 1921–22 Hamilton Tigers season was the second season of the NHL franchise in Hamilton. The team finished last in the NHL standings for the second consecutive year.

Offseason
Prior to the start of the season the team adopted new uniforms. During their inaugural season the Tigers used a uniform of vertical stripes with a logo of a tiger head; for 1921–22 a full-body image of a tiger was used, over top of horizontal stripes.

Regular season

Final standings

Record vs. opponents

Schedule and results

Playoffs
The Tigers did not qualify for the playoffs.

Player statistics

Note: Pos = Position; GP = Games played; G = Goals; A = Assists; Pts = Points; PIM = Penalty minutes      MIN = Minutes played; W = Wins; L = Losses; T = Ties; GA = Goals-against; GAA = Goals-against average; SO = Shutouts;

Awards and records

Transactions

See also
 1921–22 NHL season

References

Bibliography

 
 

Hamilton Tigers (ice hockey) seasons
Hamilton Tigers
Hamilton